Bjørlykkebreen (Bjørlykke Glacier) is a glacier in Albert I Land, Spitsbergen, Svalbard. It is a tributary of Lillehöökbreen, and is debouching into the Lilliehöökfjorden. The glacier is named after Norwegian geologist Knut Olai Bjørlykke (1860 – 1946) following a proposal in 1912 by Adolf Hoel who had traversed the glacier in 1909 together with Olaf Holtedahl.

See also
List of glaciers in Svalbard

References

Glaciers of Spitsbergen